Désiré Girouard (July 7, 1836 – March 22, 1911) was a Canadian lawyer, politician, and Puisne Justice of the Supreme Court of Canada.

Born in Saint-Timothée, Lower Canada (now part of Salaberry-de-Valleyfield, Quebec), the son of Jérémie Girouard and Hyppolite Picard, he received his Bachelor of Common Law from McGill University in 1860. He was called to the Quebec Bar in 1860 and practiced law.

In 1872 and 1874 he ran unsuccessfully for the House of Commons of Canada in the riding of the Quebec electoral districts of Jacques Cartier and Beauharnois as a Conservative, losing both times. He was elected by two votes in the 1878 election in the riding of Jacques Cartier. He was subsequently re-elected in 1882, 1887 and 1891.

In 1892, he became the first mayor of Dorval, Quebec. In 1895, he was appointed to the Supreme Court of Canada, where he served until his death in 1911. He was entombed at the Notre Dame des Neiges Cemetery in Montreal. Girouard Avenue in Notre-Dame-de-Grâce, Montreal, was named for him.

His son, Sir Édouard Percy Cranwill Girouard, was the governor of the East Africa Protectorate (Kenya).

References 

 
 
 Supreme Court of Canada Biography

Justices of the Supreme Court of Canada
Conservative Party of Canada (1867–1942) MPs
Members of the House of Commons of Canada from Quebec
Mayors of places in Quebec
1836 births
1911 deaths
People from Dorval
People from Montérégie
Lawyers in Quebec
McGill University Faculty of Law alumni
Burials at Notre Dame des Neiges Cemetery